Józef Wierusz-Kowalski (16 March 1866 - 30 November 1927) was a Polish physicist and diplomat. He discovered the phenomenon of progressive phosphorescence. He served as Rector of the University of Freiburg, and helped to establish the section for physics at the reopened University of Warsaw.  After Polish independence was established, he served as the Polish ambassador to the Holy See, the Netherlands, Austria and Turkey.

Early life and education
Józef Wierusz-Kowalski was born to Dr. Tadeusz Wierusz-Kowalski (1841–1904) and Juliet Wasilewska, in Pulawy, Kingdom of Poland, then part of Russian Empire on 16 March 1866. His father owned property in Olbięcin from 1869 to 1904.

Initially, Józef Wierusz-Kowalski studied law at the Imperial University of Warsaw, but after a year he moved to the University of Göttingen, where he studied physics. He studied the properties of glass, including its strength, and in 1889 presented his doctoral thesis, "Untersuchungen über die Festigkeit des Glases".

After working in Berlin, Würzburg and the Technical University in Zurich, Wierusz-Kowalski studied physics and physical chemistry at the University of Bern. In 1894, he accepted a faculty position in mathematics and natural sciences at the University of Fribourg in Switzerland. In 1894, he introduced Pierre Curie and Maria Skłodowska. As the chair of physics, he established the physics department.  During the academic year 1897–1998, he served as rector of the university. He remained at Fribourg until 1915.

Scientific and diplomatic career

In 1897, Wierusz-Kowalski hired Ignacy Mościcki as his assistant. Mościcki created an electric arc method for fixing nitrogen, and he and Wierusz-Kowalski set up an experimental plant around 1903, trading nitric acid as the Société de l'acide nitrique.

Wierusz-Kowalski's major fields of study were lightning and electrical discharge, luminescence and phosphorescence. Wierusz-Kowalski examined mixtures of rare-earth metal compounds such as alkali under the influence of ultraviolet radiation, studying the phosphorescence of rare-earth compounds and organic compounds. In 1910, discovered the phenomenon of progressive phosphorescence in the phosphorescence spectra of organic molecules. For his work in this field he was distinguished  in 1912 by Harvard University.

He was actively involved in the Warsaw Scientific Society, which was founded in 1907. He served as a member of the editorial board of a Polish encyclopedia, the United universal encyclopedia, published in Switzerland.  During World War I he worked with the Committee in Support of Victims of War in Poland, founded by Henryk Sienkiewicz in Vevey.

The early 1900s were a time of great unrest in Polish politics and education. In 1912 Kowalski became a  member of the Academy of Sciences and Letters in Kraków. 
In 1915, Józef Wierusz-Kowalski was one of the lecturers of physics at the Physics & Mathematics Faculty of the TKN, a secular “free university” which later became Wolna Wszechnica Polska (Free Polish University).  In 1916 he was a member of the Board of the Association of Polish Education. 
The University of Warsaw was reopened on 15 November 1915 as a Polish institution. A Section  of  Experimental  Physics was opened in 1916 as part of  the  Department  of  Philosophy, under Wierusz-Kowalski's leadership.  In January 1919 Józef Wierusz-Kowalski helped to found the Warsaw Physical Society.

In 1919 Józef Wierusz-Kowalski entered the diplomatic service of Poland, and was appointed envoy extraordinary and minister plenipotentiary to the Holy See on 1 July 1919. On 19 October 1921 he was appointed deputy of Poland at The Hague, where he remained until 1 December 1924. He was a member of the International Committee on Intellectual Cooperation of the League of Nations.  He then became the Polish ambassador in Vienna, Austria, holding the position until 30 September 1926. On 21 October 1926 he became a representative of the Republic of Poland in Ankara, Turkey, where he died.

See also
List of Poles
Timeline of Polish science and technology

References

1866 births
1927 deaths
19th-century Polish physicists
20th-century Polish physicists
Ambassadors of Poland to Austria
Ambassadors of Poland to Turkey
Rare earth scientists